Walter M Murphy Company was a manufacturer of custom bodies for top quality car chassis which operated in Colorado Street, Pasadena, California. Founded in 1922 its business ended in 1932. Employees Bohman & Schwartz set up a new business in different premises and took over remaining regular customers.

References

External links

Coachbuilders of the United States
Defunct motor vehicle manufacturers of the United States
Luxury motor vehicle manufacturers
American companies established in 1922
Manufacturing companies established in 1922
Manufacturing companies based in Los Angeles
1922 establishments in California